Herman Claudius van Riemsdijk (born 26 August 1948) is a Brazilian chess player. He was awarded the title International Master by FIDE in 1978. Van Riemsdijk was also granted the title of International Arbiter in 1981.

Born in  Tiel, the Netherlands, van Riemsdijk arrived in Brazil on 16 June 1958. He was Brazilian champion in 1970, 1973, and 1988, and Pan American champion in 1977. He played for Brazil in the Chess Olympiad eleven times (1972–1974, 1978–1984, 1988–1994, 1998) and in the Pan American Team Chess Championship three times (1971, 1985, 1991).

He has written articles for several chess publications, and with Belgian chess player Willem Diederik Hajenius he co-authored the book Final Countdown, a treatise on pawn endings. He has also been a second to Brazilian junior players, and has played as widely as New Zealand (where a brother lives) and Australia. His fluency in several languages helps.

In 2018 van Riemsdijk was awarded the title of FIDE Trainer and he was appointed captain/coach of the New Zealand women's team for the 43rd Chess Olympiad in Batumi, Georgia.

Herman van Riemsdijk's son Marius (b. 1976) is a FIDE International Arbiter.

References

External links 

Herman C Van Riemsdijk chess games at 365Chess.com

Herman Claudius van Riemsdijk's personal page (in Portuguese)

1948 births
Living people
Brazilian chess players
Chess International Masters
Chess Olympiad competitors
Chess writers
Chess arbiters
Dutch emigrants to Brazil
People from Tiel
Sportspeople from Gelderland